Ambrogio Ravasi (7 February 1929 – 30 October 2020) was an Italian-born Kenyan Roman Catholic bishop.

Ravasi was born in Italy and was ordained to the priesthood in 1957. He served as bishop of the Roman Catholic Diocese of Marsabit, Kenya from 1981 until 2006.

Notes

1929 births
2020 deaths
Italian Roman Catholic bishops in Africa
21st-century Roman Catholic bishops in Kenya
20th-century Roman Catholic bishops in Kenya
Roman Catholic bishops of Marsabit